The 2009 Indian general election in Uttar Pradesh were held for 80 seats with the state going to polls across all the five phases of the general elections. The major contenders in the state were the National Democratic Alliance (NDA), Indian National Congress, Bahujan Samaj Party (BSP) and the Fourth Front.  NDA consisted of the Bharatiya Janata Party (BJP) and Rashtriya Lok Dal whereas the fourth front was constituted of the Samajwadi Party (SP), Rashtriya Janata Dal (RJD) and Lok Janshakti Party (LJP).

After counting on 16 May 2009, to everyone's surprise, national parties, Indian National Congress and Bharatiya Janata Party, did extremely well, while regional parties, Samajwadi Party and Bahujan Samaj Party, did worse than expected. The results showed a split between SP, BSP and INC, leading each of them winning a fair share of seats in the state.  The campaigning by Rahul Gandhi proved to be very effective and his decision for Indian National Congress, to go alone in Uttar Pradesh, worked in their favour, since they ended up picking up 21 seats.

After the election, the success of the Bharatiya Janata Party, according to UP BJP leader was, the split of the Muslim votes away from SP to Congress, due to Kalyan Singh supporting the SP and the division of Dalit votes between BSP and Congress, led to success for BJP and its ally Rashtriya Lok Dal. This split also benefited Congress, since they were able bag many seats, that are usually won by either SP or BSP.

Voting and results
Source: Election Commission of India

Results by alliance

 Since the Third and Fourth front did not exist in 2004, the results in 2004 represents seats won by BSP in Third Front and SP in Fourth Front.

List of elected MPs

Note that almost all the constituencies here were seriously overhauled after
the delimitation commission.  Hence the results for 2009 reflect a different
demographic distribution.  The winner from 2004 has been reported if the
constituency name is the same, but this may reflect a completely different
basket of districts.

Sources: Winner 2009 data (first 3 columns): ECI website; Winner 2004 data from 14th Lok Sabha page; sometimes these MPs may have been elected in a later by-election.
 Mayawati (BSP); in the by-elections, the Akbarpur seat was lost to the BSP – it went to Shankhlal Majhi (SP),
 Mulayam Singh Yadav (SP), Mainpuri went to Dharmendra Yadav (SP), and
 Narendra Kushwaha (BSP), who was expelled for accepting bribes in the Operation Duryodhana scam – Mirzapur seat went to Ramesh Dubey (BSP)..

Region-wise Results

References

External links
Election Commission of India
Information About Uttar Pradesh Elections

Indian general elections in Uttar Pradesh
U